31st New York Film Critics Circle Awards
January 29, 1966(announced December 27, 1965)

Best Picture: 
 Darling 
The 31st New York Film Critics Circle Awards honored the best filmmaking of 1965.

Winners
Best Actor:
Oskar Werner - Ship of Fools
Best Actress:
Julie Christie - Darling
Best Director:
John Schlesinger - Darling
Best Film:
Darling
Best Foreign Language Film:
Juliet of the Spirits (Giulietta degli spiriti) • Italy/France

References

External links
1965 Awards

1964
New York Film Critics Circle Awards, 1965
New York Film Critics Circle Awards
New York Film Critics Circle Awards
New York Film Critics Circle Awards
New York Film Critics Circle Awards